The 2019 NASCAR Gander Outdoors Truck Series was the 25th season of the third highest stock car racing series sanctioned by NASCAR in North America. It marks the transition of the series' corporate sponsor from Camping World to its subsidiary Gander Outdoors.

Matt Crafton won his third series championship, his first since his consecutive titles in 2013 and 2014. It was the first time in Truck Series history that the champion went winless during the season. Crafton's ThorSport Racing teammate Grant Enfinger won the regular-season championship.

Teams and drivers

Complete schedule

Limited schedule

Notes

Changes

Teams
 On December 5, 2018, it was announced that Chad Finley Racing would field a full-time effort in 2019 with the No. 42 Chevrolet Silverado. Chad Finley and Robby Lyons were announced as drivers, while Bruce Cook was announced as crew chief. CFR ran part-time in the 2018 NASCAR Camping World Truck Series. However, the team elected to not run at Las Vegas as the team's hauler was damaged when exiting Atlanta. They ended up running part-time for the rest of the year.
 On December 8, 2018, MDM Motorsports announced that they would no longer field an entry in the Truck Series, as they will focus their efforts on the ARCA Racing Series and NASCAR K&N Pro Series.
 On January 28, 2019, On Point Motorsports announced they would run their No. 30 Toyota Tundra full-time in 2019 with Brennan Poole, who was without a ride for most of 2018 after his Xfinity team from 2016 and 2017 shut down. Ultimately, the team ended up going down to part-time due to lack of sponsorship and to focus on finishing better at the races they did run (Poole finished an impressive 2nd after the team skipped a race).
 On January 31, 2019, Niece Motorsports announced that they would field Timothy Peters in a second truck, the No. 44, for the first three races of the season. The No. 44 replaced the No. 22 as Niece's second truck, after AM Racing went back to being its own team independent from Niece. After originally anticipating for it to run just part-time, the No. 44 then became full-time in March after Angela Ruch joined the team for a 12 race schedule. Reid Wilson, Ross Chastain, Kyle Benjamin, Spencer Davis, Bayley Currey, and Jeffrey Abbey also ran races in the No. 44 throughout the season.
 On February 5, 2019, AM Racing announced that they would be returning in 2019, splitting away from Niece Motorsports after the two teams had merged in 2018.
 On March 14, 2019, Hill Motorsports announced an entry into the sport with plans to run about ten races over the course of the season. They purchased trucks and equipment from the closed MDM No. 99 team. Owner Timmy Hill and his brother Tyler were announced as drivers.
 On July 30, 2019, Jordan Anderson Racing and Niece Motorsports announced a partnership to field Niece's No. 38 Chevrolet for Mark Smith at the Eldora Dirt Derby.
 On August 6, 2019, Copp Motorsports owner D. J. Copp announced that the future of his team is uncertain, commenting that "some people make it hard to love the sanctioning body."

Drivers
 On November 9, 2018, Sheldon Creed announced that he would compete full-time for GMS Racing in 2019 in the organization's No. 2 entry. Creed drove for MDM Motorsports in the ARCA Racing Series in 2018, winning the championship. The No. 2 truck had been primarily driven by Cody Coughlin in 2018 before his release.
 On November 14, 2018, Kyle Busch Motorsports announced that Harrison Burton would compete full-time in the No. 18 Toyota Tundra, replacing Noah Gragson, who moved up to the NASCAR Xfinity Series.
 On November 30, 2018, DGR-Crosley announced that they have added Natalie Decker to their driver development program for 2019, where she would run a select number of Truck Series races with the No. 54 Toyota and made her debut at Daytona.
 On December 6, 2018, it was announced that 2018 NASCAR Camping World Truck Series Champion Brett Moffitt was released from the Hattori Racing Enterprises No. 16 team due to financial issues. The team had planned to replace Moffitt with a driver who has sponsorship backing. On January 8, 2019, Hattori Racing Enterprises announced that Austin Hill had signed to drive the No. 16 Toyota full-time in 2019.
 On December 6, 2018, it was announced that Anthony Alfredo would compete part-time with DGR-Crosley, sharing the No. 54 with Natalie Decker. He made his debut in the Atlanta race in the team's No. 17 since that truck's normal driver, Tyler Ankrum, had not yet turned 18 and was ineligible to race at the mile-and-a-half track. Alfredo would end up running most of his schedule in the part-time No. 15 truck after Decker ended up running almost the full season in the No. 54.
 On December 14, 2018, it was announced that Tyler Ankrum would run with DGR-Crosley in 2019. Ankrum will miss the first three races of the season due to age restrictions but then run the final twenty races of the season in the organization's No. 17 entry. On February 20, 2019, it was announced that Ryan Reed will drive the No. 17 Toyota at the Strat 200 at Las Vegas. On June 12, 2019, it was reported that Ankrum will run the season part-time due to a lack of sponsorship. However, he joined NEMCO Motorsports to run the No. 87 car at Iowa.
 On January 2, 2019, Tony Mrakovich announced that he would compete part-time in 2019 with his own team, Tony Mrakovich Racing.
 On January 7, 2019, Young's Motorsports announced that Spencer Boyd would drive the No. 20 truck full-time in 2019. Andrew Abbott returns as the crew chief. On July 30, Landon Huffman was announced to substitute for Boyd at the Eldora Dirt Derby, as Boyd was suffering from back problems. Boyd returned the next race at Michigan, but then announced on August 14, 2019, after missing the playoffs, he had decided to run only part-time the rest of the season in the Truck Series in order to concentrate on running more Cup Series races. He had made his Cup debut driving the No. 53 car for Rick Ware Racing that same weekend. Huffman would return to the No. 20 truck at Bristol.
 On January 9, 2019, Young's Motorsports announced that Gus Dean would drive the No. 12 truck full-time in 2019. LG Air Conditioning Technologies will be the main sponsor for the truck in 8 races, and former MDM Motorsports crew chief Jeff Stankiewicz will lead the team's efforts this season.
 On January 9, 2019, GMS Racing announced that Johnny Sauter would not return to the No. 21 truck for the 2019 season. Speaking to Sirius XM NASCAR Radio, Sauter said that current series champion Brett Moffitt would replace him. On January 10, GMS confirmed that Moffitt will join the team but he will drive the No. 24 truck, replacing Justin Haley. The No. 21 truck will turn into a part-time truck, driven by Sam Mayer.
 On January 18, 2019, Young's Motorsports announced that Tyler Dippel will drive the No. 02 Chevrolet full-time in 2019. Dippel drove in 2018 for DGR-Crosley and GMS Racing. On August 23, NASCAR announced that Dippel had been suspended indefinitely for violation of the sport's Code of Conduct. D. J. Kennington served as his substitute replacement for the race at Canada. Dippel was reinstated the following week on August 28, 2019.
 On January 23, 2019, Bill McAnally Racing announced that Derek Kraus will drive the No. 19 Toyota for select races in 2019.
 On January 28, 2019, it was announced that Brennan Poole will run full-time with On Point Motorsports in the No. 30 Toyota while also running for Rookie of the Year honors.
 On January 28, 2019, Kyle Busch Motorsports announced that team owner Kyle Busch will run five Truck Series races in the No. 51 Toyota.
 On February 13, 2019, it was announced that Johnny Sauter would be re-joining ThorSport Racing, the team he drove for from 2009 to 2015, in the No. 13 Ford, in 2019, replacing Myatt Snider, who was demoted to a part-time schedule in the team's No. 27 truck. On June 18, 2019, Sauter was suspended for the Gateway race after intentionally wrecking Austin Hill at Iowa. Snider was announced to substitute for Sauter at Gateway.
 On February 15, 2019, it was announced that Raphaël Lessard would drive the No. 46 for Kyle Busch Motorsports at Martinsville, Dover, and Bristol. On February 21, 2019, it was announced that Chandler Smith would drive the No. 46 at Gateway and ISM Raceway, and would drive the No. 51 for Kyle Busch Motorsports at Iowa and Bristol.
 On February 22, 2019, it was announced that U.S. Navy officer Jesse Iwuji would drive for Reaume Brothers Racing at Las Vegas.
 On March 21, 2019, AM Racing announced that Bubba Wallace would race the No. 22 Chevrolet at Martinsville. Wallace would also drive the truck in the next race at Texas after the truck's normal driver, Austin Wayne Self, was suspended indefinitely on April 1, 2019, for violating NASCAR's substance abuse policy. Self's suspension was lifted on April 30, 2019, after he completed the Road to Recovery Program.
 On March 23, 2019, it was announced that Angela Ruch would be joining Niece Motorsports driving the No. 44 truck for 12 races. She had started the season driving a select number of races in the No. 8 for NEMCO Motorsports, including Daytona where she got a top 10 finish, but there were more races open for her to run at Niece. She ended up not running in all of her originally scheduled races, leading some to think that she left the team, however, she returned at Bristol in August (her last race being two months prior). Reporter Chris Knight tweeted on August 15, 2019, that she would drive the No. 44 for the rest of the year except for Canada.
 On March 28, 2019, Kyle Busch Motorsports announced that former Roush Fenway Racing Cup Series driver Greg Biffle would come out of retirement to drive the No. 51 Toyota at Texas.
 On June 7, 2019, Ross Chastain announced that he would be running for Truck Series championship points instead of chasing the NASCAR Xfinity Series championship. Because of this last-minute decision, his Truck Series points started at the June Texas race, and his win at Kansas did not count to lock himself into the playoffs.
 On June 13, 2019, Dylan Lupton announced that he would join DGR-Crosley for six Truck Series races starting at Chicagoland.
 On July 23, 2019, Niece Motorsports announced that Bayley Currey would drive the No. 44 Chevrolet at Pocono and Michigan. On August 15, Currey was indefinitely suspended for violating NASCAR's Substance Abuse Policy. On September 18, he was reinstated by NASCAR after successfully completing his Road to Recovery Program.
 On July 24, 2019, NEMCO Motorsports announced that dirt racer Colt Gilliam would drive their No. 8 Chevrolet at the Eldora Dirt Derby. John Hunter Nemechek was originally scheduled for this race, but had a commitment with GMS in the Xfinity Series.
 On July 25, 2019, DGR-Crosley announced that dirt racer Kyle Strickler would drive their No. 54 Toyota at the Eldora Dirt Derby (instead of normal driver Natalie Decker).
 On July 25, 2019, Jordan Anderson announced that ARCA driver Carson Hocevar would drive his No. 3 Chevrolet at the Eldora Dirt Derby (instead of himself).
 On July 26, 2019, Reaume Brothers Racing announced that Devin Dodson would make his series debut in the No. 34 Chevrolet in the Eldora Dirt Derby. Dodson later ended up driving the No. 32 in that race, swapping trucks with teammate Mason Massey.
 On September 4, 2019, it was announced that four-time Las Vegas Motor Speedway Bullring track champion Justin Johnson would make his Truck Series return in the Kart Idaho Racing No. 08 Toyota at Las Vegas. It was his first start in the series since 2011.
 On September 11, 2019, it was announced that Colin Garrett will make his Truck debut in the Niece Motorsports No. 38 Chevrolet at Las Vegas.
 On November 4, 2019, it was announced that Ty Majeski would drive the Niece Motorsports No. 44 Chevrolet at Phoenix.

Crew chiefs
 In January 2019, it was announced that Frank Kerr had joined DGR-Crosley to be crew chief for Natalie Decker in her part-time Truck and ARCA schedules in the No. 54 truck and car, respectively. Kerr crew chiefed for TriStar Motorsports (which closed down) for the last three years on the No. 44 Xfinity car and then the No. 72 Cup car. Kerr replaced Kevin Manion who moved to the No. 17 DGR-Crosley truck which expanded to full-time in 2019 after running part-time in 2018.
 On January 22, 2019, it was announced that Phil Gould would be the crew chief for the No. 45 truck of Ross Chastain and Reid Wilson for Niece Motorsports. Gould was previously the crew chief for Ryan Reed's No. 16 Xfinity Series team for Roush, which closed down. He replaced Matt Weber, who was the last of five different crew chiefs the No. 45 team had in 2018. Weber went back to the ARCA Menards Series working for Chad Bryant Racing.
 On January 25, 2019, Jesse Little announced that J.R. Norris would be his crew chief in 2019, replacing Matt Noyce, who would later move over to ThorSport Racing, who his team has an alliance with. Norris' last time as a crew chief was in 2016 where he briefly crew chiefed the No. 81 (now the No. 16) Hattori Racing Enterprises truck for both Little and Ryan Truex, and then as the first ever crew chief for Niece Motorsports late that year with driver Casey Smith. After just two races, Norris was replaced by Bill Henderson. Henderson was not a crew chief for any team in 2018, but he did crew chief both the No. 22 AM Racing truck and the No. 33 Win-Tron Racing ARCA car in 2017.
 On January 29, 2019, Kyle Busch Motorsports announced its 2019 crew chief lineup: Ryan Fugle in the No. 51, Mike Hillman Jr. in the No. 18, and Marcus Richmond in the No. 4. On June 5, 2019, KBM announced changes to their crew chief lineup, with Marcus Richmond moving from Todd Gilliland's No. 4 to their part-time No. 46 truck and Michael Shelton (who had been crew chiefing the No. 46) and Wes Ward sharing crew chief duties for the No. 4.
 On February 5, 2019, Eddie Troconis was announced as the crew chief for the No. 22 AM Racing team in 2019 (after the team broke back away from Niece Motorsports). He was previously a crew chief with ThorSport Racing for three years, crew chiefing the No. 13 truck of Cameron Hayley in 2016 and then the No. 27/41 (now the No. 99) truck of Ben Rhodes for the next two years.
 On February 11, 2019, it was revealed (through the Daytona entry list) that Matt Noyce would be the new crew chief for Ben Rhodes at ThorSport Racing after Troconis left for AM Racing. In 2018 (as well as 2016), Noyce was the crew chief for Jesse Little's team (which has an alliance with ThorSport).
 On July 9, 2019, Jordan Anderson tweeted that Wally Rogers had replaced Kevin Eagle (who got a job with Niece Motorsports as the No. 44 crew chief) as crew chief for his No. 3 Chevrolet. Rogers was previously crew chief of Korbin Forrister's No. 7 Toyota.
 On July 22, 2019, GMS Racing announced that Jeff Stankiewicz will replace Doug Randolph as the crew chief of the No. 2 Chevrolet driven by Sheldon Creed. The duo won the ARCA Menards Series title in 2018. On August 6, 2019, NASCAR suspended Stankiewicz, truck chief Austin Pollak, and engineer Jonathan Stewart for three races through September 10 after the No. 2 truck was discovered to have a ballast container violation during post-race inspection following the 2019 Eldora Dirt Derby. Darren Fraley will serve as interim crew chief during Stankiewicz's suspension.
 On July 26, 2019, Young's Motorsports announced that Ryan London would replace Jeff Stankiewicz as the crew chief of the No. 12 Chevrolet driven by Gus Dean after Stankiewicz reunited with Creed at GMS Racing. London previously worked for GMS and the closed Mason Mitchell Motorsports team as a Truck and ARCA crew chief, respectfully.

Rule changes
 On February 4, 2019, NASCAR announced a new post-race inspection rule in all three series, where race-winning teams found to be in violation of the rule book will automatically be disqualified. Following a race, the first-place and second-place teams, along with at least one randomly selected car, will undergo post-race inspection. The inspection should take between 90 minutes and two hours to complete before the race winner is officially declared. The car that fails the inspection will receive last-place points and will be stripped of playoff and stage points.
At the 2019 M&M's 200 at Iowa Speedway on June 16, 2019, Ross Chastain became the first NGOTS driver to be disqualified under this rule after his truck was discovered to be too low on the front during post-race inspection. His win was given to second-place finisher Brett Moffitt. Chastain became the first race winner to be disqualified since Dale Jarrett in 1995.
 On February 4, 2019, NASCAR announced the introduction of the Triple Truck Challenge. The three-race program gives drivers the chance to win bonus money. Set to take place at Texas on June 7, Iowa on June 15, and Gateway on June 22, the winning team collects a $50,000 bonus on any of the three events. The team that wins two of the three races collects an additional $150,000, while winning all three races results in a total bonus of $500,000. Only drivers who declare points for the Gander Outdoors Truck Series are eligible for the Triple Truck Challenge.
 On February 4, 2019, NASCAR announced a change in the qualifying schedule procedures for majority of its tracks. For short tracks and intermediate speedways, the first round will be shortened from 15 minutes to 10 minutes, while the second and third rounds will remain at 10 and five minutes, respectively. The down time intervals at all tracks will be reduced from seven minutes to five minutes. Superspeedway qualifications will retain their untimed two-round intervals of single-lap qualifying while road courses will continue to use two qualifying rounds: 25 minutes for the first round and 10 minutes for the final round.
 On May 1, 2019, following continued gamesmanship and other actions causing multi-car qualifying to become "untenable," NASCAR formally returned to single-car qualifying at all oval tracks.
At oval tracks 1.25 miles and larger, each car will get a single timed lap.
At oval tracks 1.25 miles and smaller, each car will get two timed laps with the faster lap counting as their official time.
The qualifying order draw will be determined in part by the previous race's starting lineup. The top 20 starters from the previous race will draw to take their qualifying lap in positions 21-40 (the second half of qualifying). The remainder of cars will draw to qualify in positions 1-20.
The next car will be sent once the preceding car takes the white flag. This should ensure qualifying is completed in roughly 40 minutes baring any interruptions for crashes, debris, or weather.
There will be two-minute TV breaks built into qualifying to ensure every car gets covered live during the session.
Broadcasters FOX and NBC have committed to using ghost car graphics and impose other technologies to make the session more exciting to TV viewers.
Each car must complete their lap for the session to be counted, otherwise all times will be erased and cars will start by owner points.
Multi-car qualifying will remain at road course events.

Schedule

The schedule for the 2019 season was released on June 13, 2018. The only changes are the Eldora Dirt Derby and the Gander RV 150 switching spots and the Vankor 350 being moved from the second race of the Round of 6 to the fifth race of the season, with the rest of the races afterwards being bumped one spot back as a result.

Triple Truck Challenge races in bold

Results and standings

Race results

Drivers' standings

(key) Bold – Pole position awarded by time. Italics – Pole position set by final practice results or owner's points. * – Most laps led. 1 – Stage 1 winner. 2 – Stage 2 winner. 1-10 – Regular season top 10 finishers.
. – Eliminated after Round of 8
. – Eliminated after Round of 6

Owners' championship (Top 15)
(key) Bold – Pole position awarded by time. Italics – Pole position set by final practice results or rainout. * – Most laps led. 1 – Stage 1 winner. 2 – Stage 2 winner. 1-10 – Owners' regular season top 10 finishers. 
. – Eliminated after Round of 8
. – Eliminated after Round of 6

Manufacturers' Championship

See also
2019 Monster Energy NASCAR Cup Series
2019 NASCAR Xfinity Series
2019 ARCA Menards Series
2019 NASCAR K&N Pro Series East
2019 NASCAR K&N Pro Series West
2019 NASCAR Whelen Modified Tour
2019 NASCAR PEAK Mexico Series
2019 NASCAR Whelen Euro Series
2019 NASCAR Pinty's Series

References

2019 in NASCAR
NASCAR Truck Series seasons